Farewell 1 Tour: Live from Melbourne is a double DVD by Eagles, released in 2005. It was filmed in Melbourne, Australia at the Rod Laver Arena on November 14, 15 and 17, 2004, featuring two new songs.

It is the first Eagles live video as a quartet without Don Felder, who was terminated from the band in 2001 (but it did feature four other backing musicians, along with a four-piece horn section). This would also mark the last Eagles live video with founding member Glenn Frey before his death in 2016.

The name 'Farewell Tour' has nothing to do with the band's plan to quit touring and this is confirmed by Glenn Frey's quote in the interview contained in the DVD: "The longer this goes on, the better these songs sound. There is a 'sort of' honesty in calling the tour Farewell 1, with its implication that Farewell 2 will follow soon."

The concert marks the band's first use of pre-recorded rhythm tracks, namely a track consisting of muted guitar strums on "Hotel California" (which were overdubbed on the original studio version, but were absent from previous live performances of the song) and a backing rhythm track for Don Henley's rendition of his fast-paced solo hit "The Boys of Summer". The two new songs included in the DVD are "One Day At A Time" (Walsh) and "No More Cloudy Days" (Frey).

In November 2006, the DVD was re-issued at Wal-Mart stores with a bonus 3-track CD which are teasers of the band's upcoming studio album. The tracks are a studio version of Frey's "No More Cloudy Days", the Henley/Frey penned rocker "Fast Company" and the Henley/Schmit/Smith penned ballad "Do Something".

The performance was first released in a high-definition 1080p/DTS 5.1 format as an HD DVD in 2005. In 2013, it was released as a single Blu-ray disc.

Track listing

Disc One
 "Opening Sequence" (Glenn Frey, Richard Davis)
 "The Long Run" (Don Henley, Frey)
 "New Kid in Town" (Henley, Frey, J. D. Souther)
 "Wasted Time (Henley, Frey) / Wasted Time (Reprise)" (Henley, Frey, Jim Ed Norman)
 "Peaceful Easy Feeling" (Jack Tempchin)
 "I Can't Tell You Why" (Henley, Frey, Timothy B. Schmit)
 "One of These Nights" (Frey, Henley)
 "One Day at a Time" (new; Joe Walsh)
 "Lyin' Eyes" (Frey, Henley)
 "The Boys of Summer" (Mike Campbell, Henley)
 "In the City" (Walsh, Barry De Vorzon)
 "Already Gone" (Tempchin, Rob Stradlund) / Silent Spring (Intro) (Frey, Jay Oliver)
 "Tequila Sunrise" (Frey, Henley)
 "Love Will Keep Us Alive" (Jim Capaldi, Paul Carrack, Peter Vale)
 "No More Cloudy Days" (new; Frey)
 "Hole in the World" (Frey, Henley)
 "Take It to the Limit" (Frey, Henley, Randy Meisner)
 "You Belong to the City" (Frey, Tempchin)
 "Walk Away" (Walsh)
 "Sunset Grill" (Henley, Danny Kortchmar, Benmont Tench)

Disc Two
 "Life's Been Good" (Walsh)
 "Dirty Laundry" (Henley, Kortchmar)
 "Funk #49" (Jim Fox, Dale Peters, Walsh)
 "Heartache Tonight" (Frey, Henley, Bob Seger, Souther)
 "Life in the Fast Lane" (Frey, Henley, Walsh)
 "Hotel California" (Don Felder, Henley, Frey)
 "Rocky Mountain Way" (Rocky Grace, Kenny Passarelli, Joe Vitale, Walsh)
 "All She Wants to Do Is Dance" (Kortchmar)
 "Take It Easy" (Jackson Browne, Frey)
 "Desperado" (Frey, Henley)

Personnel

Eagles
Glenn Frey - guitars, piano, keyboards, vocals
Don Henley - drums, percussion, guitars, vocals
Timothy B. Schmit - bass guitar, vocals
Joe Walsh - guitars, slide guitar, keyboards, organ, vocals

Background musicians
Steuart Smith:  guitars, backing vocals (primarily replaces Don Felder who was fired from the Eagles in 2001)
Michael Thompson: Keyboards, accordion, backing vocals
Will Hollis: Keyboards, backing vocals
Scott Crago: Drums, percussion, backing vocals, sound effects (e.g. car horns and brakes on "Life's Been Good", and clapping sounds in "Heartache Tonight")
Bill Armstrong: Trumpet
Al Garth: Saxophone, violin and percussion
Chris Mostert: Tenor and alto saxophone
Greg Smith: Baritone saxophone

Bonus DVD
Behind the Scenes footage
New Interviews
A Glimpse Backstage
Soundcheck

Bonus CD included at Wal-Mart stores
"No More Cloudy Days" (Frey)
"Fast Company" (Henley/Frey)
"Do Something" (Henley/Schmit/Smith)

Charts and certifications

References

External links
 

Eagles (band) live albums
Eagles (band) video albums
2005 video albums
2005 live albums
Live video albums